Hezzelin I (also called Hezilo or Hermann), Count in Zülpichgau (died 1033), son of count palatine Hermann I of Lotharingia.

He married a daughter of Duke Conrad I of Carinthia and had:

 Heinrich I Count Palatine of Lotharingia from 1045 until 1060;
  Herman, Count of Avelgau
 Conrad III of Zulpichgau, Duke of Carinthia from 1056 until 1061 (died 1061).

References

Sources

Counts Palatine of Lotharingia
1033 deaths
Year of birth unknown